A home lift not to be confused with a home elevator is a type of lift specifically designed for private homes, where the design takes into consideration the following four factors: 

1. Compact design in view of the limitations of space in a private residence,

2. Usage of the lift restricted primarily to the residents of the private homes,

3. Special facilities to meet the needs of elderly and handicapped persons, including wheelchair and stairlift users, and

4. Quiet, smooth, jerk-free movement of the lift and Controls to have ease of operation.

A home lift may be linked to specific country codes or directives. For example, the European standard of Machine Directive 2006 42 EC requires compliance with 194 parameters of safety for a lift to be installed inside a private property.

Overview 

Home lifts are compact lifts for 2 to 4 persons. Unlike hydraulic lifts or traditional "gear and counterweight" operated elevators, a home lift doesn't require additional space for machine room, over head, or pit, making it more suitable for domestic and private use. Often, maintenance costs are also lower than a more conventional lift.

The driving system for a home lift is often built inside the lift structure itself and features a screw, an electric motor, and a nut mounted behind the control panel of the lift's platform; it is thus referred to as a "screw and nut" system. When the lift is operated, the engine forces the nut to rotate around the screw, pushing the lift up and down. Most home lifts come with an open platform structure to free even more space and grant access from 3 different sides of the platform. This requires all producers to include specific safety mechanisms and, in some countries, to limit the travel speed.

Home lifts have been present on the market for decades, and represent a growing trend. Most common producers are based in Europe, such as the Sweden-based Aritco Lifts AB, active since 1995, Sweden-based Swift Home Lifts AB, active since 2020, British manufacturer Wessex Lift Co. Ltd., active since 1976. Many home lifts producers sell their products through their network, but it is not rare to see them providing their lifts to bigger elevating system groups. Several lift manufacturers enter new markets like India with customization and installation partners who have scaled up their technical capabilities.

Types

Cable-driven home lifts 

Cable-driven home lifts consist of a shaft, a cabin, a control system and counterweights. Some models also require a technical room. Cable-driven lifts are similar to those found in commercial buildings. These elevators take up most space due to the shaft and the equipment room, so installing a cable system in a new building is much easier than trying to retrofit an existing building. Traction elevators need a pulley system for movement. They are less common for new buildings, as hydraulic technology is used in most cases.

Chain-driven home lifts 

Chain-driven home lifts are similar to cable-driven lifts, but they use a chain wrapped around a drum instead of a cable to raise and lower the car. Chains are more durable than cables and do not need to be replaced as often. Chain-driven home lifts also do not require a separate machine room, which saves space.

Machine room-less home lifts 

Machine room-less home lifts operate by sliding up and down a travel path with a counterweight. This type is an excellent choice for existing residential buildings, since neither machine rooms nor pits reaching into the ground are required. However, traction elevators still require additional space above the elevator roof to accommodate the components required to raise and lower the car. Shaftless home lifts consist of a rectangular elevator cabin positioned on a rail. The lift travels on the route from the lower floor to the upper floor and back.

Hydraulic home lifts 

Hydraulic home lifts are driven by a piston that moves in a cylinder. Since the drive system is completely housed in the elevator shaft, no machine room is required and the control system is small enough to fit into a cabinet on a wall near the elevator. For hydraulic systems with holes, the cylinder must extend to the depth of the floor corresponding to the feet of the elevator, while hydraulic systems without holes do not require a pit.

Pneumatic home lifts 

Pneumatic home lifts use a vacuum system inside a tube to drive their movement. A pit or machine room is not required, so pneumatic home lifts are easiest to retrofit into an existing home. Pneumatic lifts consist of acrylic tubes or glass (typically about 80 cm in diameter). It look like a mail tube you may know from films or older buildings. Pneumatic elevators are not hidden in the wall and are normally placed in the near to a staircase.

Electric home lifts 
Electric home lifts are powered by an electric motor that plugs into a 13-amp power socket, like any other household appliance. They use a steel roped drum-braked gear motor drive system which means it is self-contained within the roof space of the lift car itself. 'Through floor' dual rail lifts create a self-supporting structure and the weight of the entire structure and lift are in compression through the rails into the floor of the home.

Screw-nut driven home lifts 
Screw-nut driven home lifts are designed around the concept of a motor that rotates a nut, which turns the screw thus moves the lift up and down. It’s known to be reliable, safe and space efficient, and requires less maintenance than hydraulic or belt driven elevators. most commonly used up to 6 floors.

Design and customizability 
Home lifts, pre-installed or retro fitted usually comes with some design options, this is so the owner can make it fit their house. Color and size are the most common choices such as white, grey and black. However, Some lift producers such as Swift Home Lifts and others go beyond this and provide options for the artwall (backwall) carpet colors and patterns, And this gives the customer variety of options of options to consider and to match each homes interior design.

See also
 Stairlift
 Wheelchair lift
 Elevator

References 

 

Elevators
Home automation